The Main road 42 is a west–east direction First class main road in Hungary, that connects Püspökladány (the Main road 4 change) with Ártánd (the border of Romania). Most of the traffic was taken over by the M4 expressway.

The road, as well as all other main roads in Hungary, is managed and maintained by Magyar Közút, state owned company.

See also

 Roads in Hungary

Sources

External links
 Hungarian Public Road Non-Profit Ltd. (Magyar Közút Nonprofit Zrt.)
 National Infrastructure Developer Ltd.

Main roads in Hungary
Hajdú-Bihar County